Tamboerskloof is a neighbourhood and suburb of Cape Town, South Africa. It lies on the slopes of Lion's Head and Signal Hill, adjacent to the neighbourhoods of Gardens and Bo-Kaap. Tamboerskloof is one of the contiguous group of neighbourhoods referred to as the City Bowl.

Etymology 
The name Tamboerskloof is derived from the Dutch and Afrikaans words tamboer (drum) and kloof (valley). When Dutch settlers arrived and set up farms in the 1650s, they established the first of a series of lookout points at the site where Tamboerskloof lies today. From these lookout points, watchmen would beat drums to alert farmers in the area to the approach of a ship. Thanks to this, farmers would know that it was time to make their way to Cape Town harbour with their crops.

Neighbourhood Watch
There is a very active neighbourhood watch called Tamboerskloof Neighbourhood Watch (TBKWatch) which assists the community with volunteer patrols, a radio network, a CCTV network and reporting of service issues such as out of order street lights, traffic lights, potholes, and blocked drains. They work very closely with a community control room (Watchcom), the South African Police Service, City of Cape Town Metro Police, nearby City Improvement Districts, as well as local armed response companies.

Schools
Several schools can be found within Tamboerskloof, including:
Tamboerskloof Primary School
German International School Cape Town
Jan van Riebeek Primary School
Jan van Riebeek High School.

Demographics
According to the 2001 Census, the population of Tamboerskloof was 2 921. The following tables show various demographic data about Tamboerskloof from that census.

Gender

Ethnic Group

Home Language

References

External links

Tamboerskloof Neighbourhood Watch
Cape Town Central Watchcom (community control room)
Tamboerskloof Primary School

Suburbs of Cape Town